Medirigiriya is a town located in Polonnaruwa District in North Central Province, Sri Lanka.

3D Heritage Documentation 
The Zamani Project, document cultural heritage sites in 3D to create a record for future generations. The documentation is based on terrestrial laser-scanning. The 3D documentation of Medirigiriya Watadageya was carried out in 2019. 3D models, a Panorama tour, plans and images can be view here.

See also
 Medirigiriya Vatadage
 Medirigiriya National School
 Medirigiriya Divisional Secretariat
 Medirigiriya Electoral District

References

Populated places in Polonnaruwa District
Populated places in Sri Lanka